Rayón is a town and one of the 119 Municipalities of Chiapas, in southern Mexico.

As of 2010, the municipality had a total population of 9,002, up from 6,870 as of 2005. It covers an area of 94.4 km².

As of 2010, the town of Rayón had a population of 5,895. Other than the town of Rayón, the municipality had 43 localities, none of which had a population over 1,000.

References

Municipalities of Chiapas